Luigi Lauro (born 31 January 1951) is a former Italian male long-distance runner who competed at five editions of the IAAF World Cross Country Championships (from 1974 to 1979).

References

External links
 Luigi Lauro profile at Association of Road Racing Statisticians

1951 births
Living people
Italian male long-distance runners
Italian male cross country runners